Goniofusus spectrum is a species of sea snail, a marine gastropod mollusk in the family Fasciolariidae, the spindle snails, the tulip snails and their allies.

Description

Distribution
Dredged at 100-180 feet in open water, 
off Cocos Island, Pacific side of Costa Rica.

References

 Vermeij G.J. & Snyder M.A. (2018). Proposed genus-level classification of large species of Fusininae (Gastropoda, Fasciolariidae). Basteria. 82(4-6): 57-82.

External links
 Reeve L.A. (1847-1848). Monograph of the genus Fusus. In: Conchologia Iconica, vol. 4, pls 1-21 and unpaginated text. L. Reeve & Co., London.
 all W.H. (1908). Reports on the dredging operations off the west coast of Central America to the Galapagos, to the west coast of Mexico, and in the Gulf of California, in charge of Alexander Agassiz, carried on by the U.S. Fish Commission steamer "Albatross," during 1891, Lieut.-Commander Z.L. Tanner, U.S.N., commanding. XXXVII. Reports on the scientific results of the expedition to the eastern tropical Pacific, in charge of Alexander Agassiz, by the U.S. Fish Commission steamer "Albatross", from October, 1904 to March, 1905, Lieut.-Commander L.M. Garrett, U.S.N., commanding. XIV. The Mollusca and Brachiopoda. Bulletin of the Museum of Comparative Zoology. 43(6): 205-487, pls 1-22

spectrum
Gastropods described in 1848